Shahrak (also known as Sharq) is a village in Solgi Rural District, Khezel District, Nahavand County, Hamadan Province, Iran. At the 2006 census, its population was 2,931, in 704 families.

References 

Populated places in Nahavand County